Mohammad Reza Saket (born 8 February 1962) is an Iranian businessman and football administrator, who is currently the chairman of the Sepahan F.C. from 2020 for second term and representative of club chairpersons of Football Federation Islamic Republic of Iran from 2022. 

He was the former general secretary of Football Federation Islamic Republic of Iran and the chairman of Iranian football club Sepahan F.C. from 2002 until his resignation in 2011.

Titles
 Iran Pro League (3): 2002–03, 2009–10, 2010–11
 Hazfi Cup (3): 2004, 2006, 2007

References

Iranian football chairmen and investors
Living people
Iranian sports executives and administrators
1962 births